Congregation Beth Israel / West Side Jewish Center / Hudson Yards Synagogue is an Orthodox congregation located at 347 West 34th Street, Manhattan, New York, in the Garment District, near Penn Station. Established in 1890, it constructed its current building in 1924–1925. Rabbis have included Joseph Schick, Norman Lamm, and Solomon Kahane. , the rabbi was Jason Herman.

Early history
Congregation Beth Israel West Side Jewish Center was established in 1890 by Orthodox German Jews and Jews from Austria-Hungary. In its early years the congregation worshiped at 252 West 35th Street, a building later purchased by St. Paul Baptist Church.

In 1905, the congregation constructed a new synagogue building at 252 West 35th Street, designed by architect John H. Knubel. Its sanctuary sat 600. In 1924, it broke ground for its current three-story building at 347 West 34th Street. The "somber" neoclassical building, designed by Gronenberg & Leuchtag, was completed in 1925.

Dr. Joseph Schick became rabbi in 1926. Born in Ónod in Austria-Hungary in 1892, he served as a chaplain in the Austro-Hungarian army during World War I, and was the rabbi of Budapest's Beth Israel synagogue of 1918 to 1922, then emigrated to the United States. His books The Kaddish: Its Power for Good and Joseph's Harvest were published in 1928 and 1932 respectively. He served until his death in 1938, at age 49.

Schick was succeeded in 1939 by Harry M. Katzen and then William Novack, and then in 1940 by Leo Ginsburg.

1950s to 2000
In 1952, Norman Lamm, later president of Yeshiva University for over 25 years, was appointed to the role. He would serve until 1958, before moving to the (unrelated) Upper West Side Jewish Center. 

Solomon (Shlomo) Kahane, ordained in 1954 at Yeshiva University, was subsequently rabbi of the congregation for 38 years and widely considered the synagogue's most prominent Rabbi. He died in April, 2004. He was a first cousin of Rabbi Meir Kahane, the founder of the Jewish Defense League and the Israeli political party Kach. The Jewish Defense League's first meeting was held at the West Side Jewish Center on June 18, 1968.

Events since 2000
Kahane was succeeded by Dr. Richard Weiss. A licensed physician, Rabbi Weiss subsequently became rabbi of Young Israel of Hillcrest in Queens.

Jason Herman succeeded Weiss as the congregation's spiritual leader. Herman received a degree at Yeshivat Chovevei Torah. He is the Executive Director of the International Rabbinic Fellowship, serves as an officer of the New York Board of Rabbis and the Zionist Rabbinic Coalition, is the founder of the Israel Academic Institute and is a past fellow at Rabbis Without Borders. Known for his activism, he was one of 22 Rabbis arrested at the United Nations in 2007 after a protest demanding Iranian President Mahmoud Ahmedinejad be barred from speaking to the General Assembly. In 2008, he was one of a group of individuals  who boycotted kosher meat from Agriprocessors over concerns that the company's practices were unethical.

The synagogue was in the news in 2007. The congregation rents the entire side of its building for advertisements and parking  and that year it was covered with a huge billboard for the film Resident Evil: Extinction. The image did not offend any members, according to Herman, and the congregation who mainly found out after the fact, we’re convinced that the additional income generated by the billboard helpful for maintaining the building.

In 2015 the congregation began a multi-year process with architect Esther Sperber to explore options for renovating the synagogue building. At one point it considered a proposal to demolish the existing structure, and replace it with a large, multi-story multi-use synagogue and condominium. However, in 2016 Herman, and the congregation president, stated that the membership had "quite overwhelmingly rejected any plans for demolition of our current synagogue building and any plan we might pursue will preserve our existing synagogue structure". The president stated that congregation would instead probably renovate the existing structure so that it conformed with current building codes, and develop the synagogue-owned parking lot next to the building. A recent article written in the JTA detailed some of these plans as of 2019.

Herman discovered in 2017 that his name had been added to a "blacklist" of 160 rabbis whose credentials were rejected for the purposes of certifying to the Chief Rabbinate of Israel that individuals in Israel claiming to be Jewish were, in fact, Jewish. He surmised that it was because of a letter he had written in 2012 vouching for a non-Orthodox Jewish woman. Oddly, after a different married rabbi vouched for the individual, the Rabbinate allowed Herman to officiate at the wedding.

In 2016, the synagogue began using the additional name Hudson Yards Synagogue.

Notes

References

The New York Times, no byline:

External links
West Side Jewish Center website

1890 establishments in New York (state)
Austrian-Jewish culture in the United States
German-Jewish culture in New York City
Hungarian-Jewish culture in New York (state)
Hell's Kitchen, Manhattan
Neoclassical synagogues
Orthodox synagogues in New York City
Religious organizations established in 1890
Synagogues completed in 1905
Synagogues completed in 1925
Synagogues in Manhattan
34th Street (Manhattan)